Sally Clare Kellerman (June 2, 1937 – February 24, 2022) was an American actress and singer whose acting career spanned 60 years. Her role as Major Margaret "Hot Lips" Houlihan in Robert Altman's film M*A*S*H (1970) earned her an Oscar nomination for Best Actress in a Supporting Role. After M*A*S*H, she appeared in a number of the director's projects, namely the films Brewster McCloud (1970), Welcome to L.A. (1976) (produced by Altman, directed by his protégé, Alan Rudolph), The Player (1992), and Prêt-à-Porter (1994), and the short-lived anthology TV series Gun (1997). In addition to her work with Altman, Kellerman appeared in films such as Last of the Red Hot Lovers (1972), Back to School (1986), plus many television series such as The Twilight Zone (1963), The Outer Limits (1963 & 1965), Star Trek (1966), Bonanza (1966, 1970), The Minor Accomplishments of Jackie Woodman (2006), 90210 (2008), Chemistry (2011), and Maron (2013). She also voiced Miss Finch in Sesame Street Presents: Follow That Bird (1985), which went on to become one of her most significant voice roles.

At age 18, Kellerman signed a recording contract with Verve Records, but her first album (Roll with the Feelin on the Decca label) was not recorded until 1972. A second album Sally was released in 2009. Kellerman also contributed songs to the soundtracks for Brewster McCloud (1970), Lost Horizon (1973), Rafferty and the Gold Dust Twins (1975), and Boris and Natasha: The Movie (1992).

Kellerman did commercial voiceover work for Hidden Valley Ranch salad dressing, Mercedes-Benz, and Revlon. Kellerman's animation work included The Mouse and His Child (1977), Happily Ever After (1990), Dinosaurs (1992), Unsupervised (2012), and The High Fructose Adventures of Annoying Orange (2013). In 2013, she released her memoir Read My Lips: Stories of a Hollywood Life, describing her trials and tribulations in the entertainment business.

Early life
Kellerman was born in Long Beach, California, on June 2, 1937 to Edith Baine (née Vaughn), a piano teacher from Portland, Arkansas, and John Helm "Jack" Kellerman, a Shell Oil executive from St. Louis, Missouri. She had an older sister, Diana Dean Kellerman. Her younger sister, Victoria Vaughn Kellerman, died in infancy. Edith was a Christian Scientist and raised her daughters in this faith.

When Kellerman was in fifth grade, the family moved from Long Beach to the San Fernando Valley. She spent her early life in then-rural Granada Hills in a largely unpopulated area surrounded by orange and eucalyptus groves. During her sophomore year of high school, the Kellermans moved from San Fernando to Park La Brea, Los Angeles, where she attended Hollywood High School. She grew to stand 5'10 1/2" (179.07 cms). Due to her shyness, she made few friends and received poor grades (except in choir and physical education) but appeared in a school production of Meet Me in St. Louis.

With the help of a high-school friend, Kellerman submitted a recording demo to Verve Records founder and head Norman Granz. After signing a contract with Verve, however, she was daunted by the task of becoming a recording artist and walked away.

Kellerman attended Los Angeles City College, and also enrolled in Jeff Corey's acting class. Within a year, she appeared in a production of John Osborne's Look Back in Anger staged by Corey and featuring classmates Shirley Knight, Jack Nicholson, Dean Stockwell, and Robert Blake. Towards the end of the 1950s, Kellerman joined the newly opened Actors Studio West and debuted before the camera in the film, Reform School Girl (1957). To pay her tuition, Kellerman worked as a waitress at Chez Paulette.

Career

1960s
Kellerman made a number of television-series appearances. She was in an episode of the western Cheyenne, as well as a role as a waitress in the John Forsythe sitcom Bachelor Father. Struggling for parts in television and films, Kellerman acted on stage. She debuted in Henrik Ibsen's An Enemy of the People, followed by parts in a Pasadena Playhouse production of Leslie Stevens's The Marriage-Go-Round and Michael Shurtleff's Call Me by My Rightful Name (1962).

Kellerman appeared in two episodes of The Outer Limits. First in 1963 in the episode The Human Factor, and again in 1965 when she played Judith Bellero, the manipulative and ruthless wife of Richard Bellero (played by Martin Landau), in the episode titled "The Bellero Shield". A role as Holly Mitchell, perverted mistress of George Peppard's character in The Third Day (1965), followed. She played leading lady to David Niven in his television series The Rogues in 1965 for an episode titled "God Bless You, G. Carter Huntington" which revolved around her striking beauty to a large degree, and appeared in a 1965 Alfred Hitchcock Hour episode titled "Thou Still Unravished Bride."

A year later, she played psychiatrist Elizabeth Dehner (who studied the long-term effects of space on a crew) in "Where No Man Has Gone Before", the second pilot for Star Trek. Three months after that, Kellerman played Mag Wildwood in the original Broadway production of Breakfast at Tiffany's, directed by Joseph Anthony and produced by David Merrick, which closed after four preview performances. Before the closing the musical numbers were recorded live, and she recorded three songs which appeared on the original cast recording.

Near the end of the decade, Kellerman guest-starred in The Invaders in the episode "Labyrinth" (1968). She also had turns as the severely beaten (and only surviving) victim of Albert DeSalvo in the Boston Strangler (1968), and Phyllis Brubaker (Jack Lemmon's materialistic wife) in the romantic comedy The April Fools (1969). She turned down a role in Paul Mazursky's Bob & Carol & Ted & Alice (1969). She played Eleanor in the Hawaii Five-O episode "The Big Kahuna" (1969).

In a 1971 Life magazine interview, Kellerman remembered her television years: "It took me eight years to get into TV — and six years to get out. Frigid women, alcoholics they gave me. I got beat up, raped, and never played comedy."

1970s
Kellerman received her breakthrough role (Major Margaret "Hot Lips" Houlihan in Robert Altman's M*A*S*H) in 1970. Her performance received Academy Award and Golden Globe nominations, winning the Kansas City Film Critics Circle (KCFCC) Award for Best Supporting Actress, the Golden Laurel for Best Comedy Performance (Female), and a second-place National Society of Film Critics (NSFC) Award for Best Supporting Actress. Kellerman was featured in Life magazine. She again collaborated with Altman in Brewster McCloud as Louise, guardian angel to Bud Cort, and recorded "Rock-a-Bye Baby" for the film's soundtrack.

Her next role was as a hostile, chain-smoking, sex-addicted woman who was trying to have an afternoon affair with Alan Arkin's character in Gene Saks' film adaptation of Neil Simon's comedy Last of the Red Hot Lovers (1972). In Manhattan after the film, Kellerman declined an offer for a ten-page spread in Vogue from the then editor-in-chief Grace Mirabella. When she refused the part of Linda Rogo in The Poseidon Adventure (1972), Stella Stevens got the role. Shortly afterwards she recorded her first demo with Lou Adler, and Roll with the Feelin for Decca Records with producer-arranger Gene Paige. After filming Last of the Red Hot Lovers, Kellerman passed up a role in another Altman film:

Kellerman's next roles included as a woman involved in a deadly plot in the slasher film A Reflection of Fear (1972); an eccentric woman in the road movie Slither opposite James Caan (1973), and a tormented journalist in Charles Jarrott's musical remake of Frank Capra's Lost Horizon (also contributing to the latter's soundtrack). Two years later, she played Mackinley Beachwood in Dick Richards' Rafferty and the Gold Dust Twins (1975), one of two women who kidnap driving instructor—and former United States Marine Corps gunnery sergeant—Rafferty (Alan Arkin), also singing "Honky Tonk Angels".

In October 1975, Kellerman sang at Reno Sweeney, and performed two shows nightly at the Rainbow Grill from November 25 to December 14. Her next appearance was as Sybil Crane (a woman in the midst of a divorce) in The Big Bus, a parody of disaster films, followed by a role as a lonely real estate agent in the Alan Rudolph-directed and Altman-produced Welcome to L.A. (both 1976). The next year, Kellerman appeared in a week-long run of cabaret concerts beginning at the Grand Finale club on May 2. Songs that evening included versions of Leon Russell and Betty Everett hits.

At the end of the decade, Kellerman's roles included Maureen, a veteran vaudevillian, in Verna: USO Girl (1978); Veronica Sterling, a party-addicted socialite, in the made-for-television film She'll Be Sweet (1978); and Lise Bockweiss—one of several wives of Pasquinel (Robert Conrad) and daughter of Herman Bockweiss (Raymond Burr)—in the 12-episode miniseries Centennial (1978–1979). Kellerman played Kay King, the pretentious and kooky mother of a lovelorn daughter (Diane Lane), in George Roy Hill's A Little Romance (1979).

1980s

Kellerman began the decade as Mary, a divorced middle-aged suburban mother struggling to raise her rebellious daughter (Jodie Foster) in Adrian Lyne's Foxes (1980); Martha, a six-times-married eccentric, in Bill Persky's Serial, and the silly-but-sophisticated Mrs. Liggett in Jack Smight's Loving Couples. Her later roles included Mary, a child psychiatrist in a sadomasochistic relationship with a psychology professor (Stephen Lackman) after they meet by accident (literally) in Michael Grant's Head On, and a 1920s socialite in Kirk Browning's made-for-television film adaptation of Dorothy Parker's 1929 short story Big Blonde (both 1980). From October 3 to November 15, 1980, Kellerman starred as Julia Seton in an Ahmanson Theatre production of Philip Barry's Holiday (directed by Robert Allan Ackerman) with Kevin Kline, Maurice Evans, and Marisa Berenson.

On February 7, 1981, Kellerman hosted Saturday Night Live, appearing in four sketches ("Monologue", "The Audition", "Was I Ever Red", and "Lean Acres") and closing the show with Donna Summer's "Starting Over Again". Kellerman's next performances were in made-for-television films. She played the title character's first wife, Maxine Cates, in Dempsey and a honky-tonk dance-hall proprietress in September Gun. That year she also appeared in a stage production, Tom Eyen's R-rated spoof of 1940s women's prison films Women Behind Bars. Kellerman played Gloria, a tough inmate who controls the other prisoners.

Her next roles were a KGB-training-school warden in the made-for-television film, Secret Weapons (1985); the sadomasochistic Judge Nedra Henderson in Moving Violations (1985); Rodney Dangerfield's love interest in Alan Metter's comedy Back to School (1986); Julie Andrews' and Jack Lemmon's eccentric neighbor in Blake Edwards' That's Life (1986); a porn star trying to get into heaven in Meatballs III: Summer Job (1986); Kerri Green's mother in Three for the Road (1987), and an actress in Henry Jaglom's Someone to Love. Late in the decade, Kellerman planned to release her second album, which would have included "It's Good to Be Bad, It's Bad to Be Good" from 1992's Boris and Natasha: The Movie (which she produced and starred in as Natasha Fatale); however, the album never was released.

1990s
In 1992, there was a fourth collaboration between Kellerman and Altman in The Player, in which she appeared as herself. Supporting roles followed in Percy Adlon's Younger and Younger (1993), Murder She Wrote (1993) and Mirror, Mirror II: Raven Dance (1994), the sequel of the Yvonne De Carlo and Karen Black horror film Mirror, Mirror. The actress appeared in another Altman film, Prêt-à-Porter (1994), as Sissy Wanamaker, editor-in-chief of Harper's Bazaar, with Tracey Ullman and Linda Hunt. During filming, Altman flew Kellerman and co-star Lauren Bacall from Paris for his tribute at Lincoln Center. From April 18 to May 21, 1995, Kellerman played the title role in the Maltz Jupiter Theatre production of Mame. Around this time, Kellerman appeared in back-to-back plays in Boston and Edmonton. In Boston, she played Martha in the Hasty Pudding Theatricals production of Who's Afraid of Virginia Woolf?, and starred as Mary Jane Dankworth in a two-month, two-character production of Lay of the Land with Michael Hogan in Edmonton. That year Kellerman planned to release her second album, Something Kool, featuring songs from the 1950s.

In 1996, Kellerman played a calculating sister in an episode of The Naked Truth, "Sister in Sex Triangle with Gazillionaire!" A year later, she collaborated with Altman for the last time in "All the President's Women", an episode of the director's TV series Gun. The actress then co-produced and reprised her Canadian stage role in a film version of The Lay of the Land.

In 1997, Kellerman was scheduled to play the title role in Mrs. Scrooge: A Slightly Different Christmas Carol, a made-for-TV film version of Charles Dickens' novella. In the film, Mrs. Scrooge is a homophobic widow whose late partner (Jacob Marley) and three other spirits awaken her to the reality of AIDS. Although it was never released, the actress told a reporter for The Advocate why the project was more personal than professional: "My sister’s gay—and was gay before it was popular... My sister is a very loving person. So is her girlfriend. And my daughter is an amazing woman. They’re all heroic in my book."

Kellerman appeared in the 1998 Columbo episode "Ashes to Ashes". On June 10, 1999, Kellerman joined actresses Kathleen Turner and Beverly Peele in a Planned Parenthood press conference supporting a proposed law introduced to the U.S. Congress.

2000s
At the beginning of the century, Kellerman appeared in Canon Theatre's production of Eve Ensler's The Vagina Monologues with Teri Hatcher and Regina Taylor.
This was followed by a cabaret show at Feinstein's at the Regency, which opened with Helen Reddy's "I Am Woman". Other songs ranged from Barbra Streisand's "The Way We Were" to "We Shall Overcome" and "America the Beautiful". In March 2002, Kellerman performed in Los Angeles' What a Pair, a benefit for breast cancer research, joining singer-songwriter Julia Fordham for "Why Can't I". That year, the actress also played protagonist Judge Marcia Blackwell in the made-for-television film Verdict in Blood. This was followed by another cabaret show, produced by Hal David, at the Palmdale Playhouse. Songs included Etta James' "Sunday Kind of Love" and "Long Way From St. Louis". An album (Body Parts) was planned, but never released.

In the summer of 2004, Kellerman played host Madame ZinZanni in Teatro ZinZanni. That year she also received the Susan B. Anthony "Failure is Impossible" Award, honoring women in the film industry who have overcome adversity, at the High Falls Film Festival. Kellerman returned to the stage for a second What a Pair concert, joining actress Lauren Frost for "I'm Past My Prime". The next year, she played Dolores Montoya in Blank Theatre Company's Los Angeles revival of The Wild Party, followed by the sexually-provocative Sandy in Susan Seidelman's Boynton Beach Club. Kellerman sang Cole Porter's "My Heart Belongs to Daddy" with actress, singer and songwriter Kathleen "Bird" York at her third (and final) What a Pair concert. In 2006 the actress appeared as herself in the first episode of the IFC's The Minor Accomplishments of Jackie Woodman, "A Cult Classic".

In September 2008, Kellerman recorded a duet with Ray Brown Jr. (son of Ella Fitzgerald and Ray Brown), "I Thought About You", for Brown's duet CD Friends and Family. In 2009, Kellerman released a jazz and blues album, Sally, her first since Roll with the Feelin. Sally featured interpretations of songs by Linda Ronstadt, Kim Carnes, Aerosmith, Nina Simone, the Motels, Neil Diamond, Jackson Browne, Marvin Gaye, Dolly Parton, Jennifer Warnes, and James Taylor. That year she also played Donette, owner of a small-town diner, in the made-for-television film The Wishing Well.

2010s
Kellerman starred with Ernest Borgnine and Mickey Rooney in Night Club (2011). Her performance as a woman with Alzheimer's living in a retirement home won an Accolade Competition Award for Best Supporting Actress. That year she played a recurring role as Lola (an eccentric artist) in Cinemax's sexually explicit comedy-drama series Chemistry, followed by guest appearances on the CW teen drama series 90210 as Marla, an aging Hollywood actress with dementia who considers assisted suicide. On July 7, 2012, Kellerman appeared with Tito Ortiz, Cary Elwes, and Drake Bell in an episode of the Biography Channel's Celebrity Ghost Stories.

On April 30, 2013, the actress released her memoir, Read My Lips: Stories of a Hollywood Life, published by Weinstein Books. In the book, she remembered a close-knit, family-oriented past Hollywood and her triumphs and tribulations as an actress during the 1960s. Kellerman made promotional book-signing appearances in Los Angeles, Santa Monica, Manhattan, and Jersey City. Shortly afterward, she appeared as Marc Maron's bohemian mother in the "Dead Possum" episode of his comedy series.

Kellerman later received a Fort Lauderdale International Film Festival (FLIFF) Lifetime Achievement Award at Cinema Paradiso in Fort Lauderdale, Florida. The ceremony, which included a montage of her work and an audience question-and-answer session, was moderated by film historian Foster Hirsch. In September 2013 filmmaker Ellen Houlihan released a short film Joan's Day Out, in which Kellerman played a grandmother who escapes from her assisted-living facility to bail her teenage granddaughter out of prison. The actress joined the Love Can Initiative, a nonprofit organization dedicated to enriching the lives of low income families and their children, in February 2014. Kellerman made a return appearance in the second season of Maron in the episode "Mom Situation", and as part of an Epix Network documentary celebrating the life of Robert Altman on August 6, 2014.

In October 2014, TVLine announced that Kellerman had been cast in the mysterious role of Constance Bingham on the daytime soap opera The Young and the Restless and was nominated for a Daytime Emmy as Best Actress in a Guest Role.  In 2016, she continued her recurring role on Maron and played in five episodes of the new series Decker.

Personal life
In 1961, Kellerman underwent a botched home abortion, and went to a hospital for the first time (due to her Christian Science upbringing). The relationship that had caused her terminated pregnancy was with bit actor William Duffy.

In the late 1960s, she was briefly involved with actor-screenwriter Lawrence Hauben. Hauben shot a documentary, Venus, about their relationship, which received a very limited theatrical release in 1971. 

After the release of MASH, on December 17, 1970, Kellerman married Starsky & Hutch producer Rick Edelstein.
Anjanette Comer, Joanne Linville, and Luana Anders were among her bridesmaids. On March 6, 1972, Kellerman divorced Edelstein, citing irreconcilable differences. "We've fought every day since we've met," she said at the time.

In 1967, Kellerman's sister, Diana, came out as a lesbian and separated from her husband, Ian Charles Cargill Graham, who took full custody of the couple's daughter, Claire. After Diana moved to France with her partner, she didn't communicate with her daughter for eight years. Sally adopted Claire on January 30, 1976, and on April 10, Ian Graham died in Edinburgh, Scotland.

For a time in the mid-1970s, Kellerman was involved with Mark Farner of the rock group Grand Funk Railroad. He wrote the song "Sally", from the 1976 album Born to Die, as an ode to their relationship. She also dated screenwriters David Rayfiel and Charles Shyer, as well as journalist Warren Hoge, producer Jon Peters, and actor Edd Byrnes. In her autobiography, Kellerman made a point to note that her romance with Byrnes was never consummated.

On May 11, 1980, Kellerman married producer Jonathan D. Krane in a private ceremony at Jennifer Jones's Malibu home. In 1989, the couple adopted newborn twins, Jack Donald and Hanna Vaughan, who were born on June 24 of that year. The family relocated to Jupiter, Florida in 1991. After encountering financial difficulties, they sold their condo there in 2008 and moved back to Hollywood.

Jonathan Krane died of a heart attack on August 1, 2016, aged 64. Their adopted daughter, Hanna Krane, died on October 22, 2016, at age 27 from heroin and methamphetamine use.

Kellerman and Krane separated twice during their 36-year marriage, first for a few months in 1994, then again during 1997–98 over Krane's public affair with Nastassja Kinski. As Kellerman had dated married men in the past, she forgave her husband for the affair.

Kellerman died from heart failure at a care facility in Woodland Hills, Los Angeles, on February 24, 2022, at the age of 84. At the time of her death, she had dementia.

Filmography

Television

Awards and nominations

Source:

Discography
 Roll with the Feelin''' (Decca, 1972)
 Sally (The Music Force, 2009)

Bibliography
 Kellerman, Sally (2013). Read My Lips: Stories of a Hollywood Life''. Weinstein Books. .

References

Sources

External links
 Sally Kellerman at Facebook
 
 

1937 births
2022 deaths
20th-century American actresses
21st-century American actresses
21st-century American memoirists
Actresses from Long Beach, California
American Christian Scientists
American film actresses
American television actresses
American voice actresses
American women memoirists
American women singers
California Democrats
American LGBT rights activists
Los Angeles City College alumni